Sam Farmer is an American sportswriter for the Los Angeles Times. He was the 2019 Dick McCann Memorial Award recipient.

Career
Farmer graduated from La Canada High School in 1984, and Occidental College in 1988. He spent five seasons as the Oakland Raiders beat writer for the San Jose Mercury News before moving to the Times.

Farmer has covered the NFL since 1994, and has been with the Los Angeles Times since 2000. He won praise for his work chronicling the National Football League's return to Los Angeles following the 1995 departure of the Raiders and Rams, and culminating with the return of the Rams and Chargers. He was named the California Sportswriter of the Year by the National Sportscasters and Sportswriters Association in 2016 and 2019, and in 2019 received the Dick McCann Memorial Award from the Pro Football Hall of Fame.

References

Los Angeles Times people
The Mercury News people
Dick McCann Memorial Award recipients
Year of birth missing (living people)
Living people
American sportswriters